Time After Time is a 1986 British-Australian television comedy film that was broadcast as episode 3 of the second series of BBC's Screen Two. It was directed by Bill Hays and adapted from the Molly Keane novel by Andrew Davies. It features John Gielgud, Googie Withers, Helen Cherry, Ursula Howells, and Trevor Howard.

Premise
A constantly bickering Anglo-Irish family live in a crumbling 'big house', when their lives are interrupted by the unexpected arrival of a German cousin.

ACE award nomination
John Gielgud was nominated for a CableACE Award for Time After Time on the Arts & Entertainment network

References

External links 
 

1986 television films
1986 films
Australian television films
British television films
1980s English-language films